Črni Kal is a village in southwestern Slovenia in the City Municipality of Koper. It is best known today for the Črni Kal Viaduct, the longest and the highest viaduct in Slovenia.

Name
The name Črni Kal literally means 'black pond', based on the common noun kal 'pond, watering hole' and referring to a local geographical feature.

Architecture

Houses
The village has some good examples of traditional Karst architecture. One such monument is the Benko House, built in 1489 by stonemasons Andrej (Andrew) and Benko (Benjamin) as indicated by an inscription on the building: Andreas et Benco construxerunt. This makes it oldest surviving farmhouse in the Koper area and is also the oldest signed and dated secular building in all of Slovenia. It stands on the lower edge of the village core and is made of chiseled limestone and marlstone blocks. It comprises two buildings with inscriptions in the Glagolitic alphabet on the  facade. The older building is the main house, with Romanesque as well as late-Gothic features.

Church
The local church is dedicated to Saint Lawrence and belongs to the Parish of Predloka.

References

External links

Črni Kal on Geopedia

Populated places in the City Municipality of Koper